Kukum Field also known as Fighter 2 Airfield is a former World War II airfield on Guadalcanal, Solomon Islands.

World War II
From the beginning of the Guadalcanal Campaign it was planned that the area would be developed into a major air base. In November 1942 the 6th Naval Construction Battalion began work on a fighter strip at Lunga Point. The 6th Battalion was later replaced by the First Marine Aviation Engineers who completed the coral-surfaced runway by 1 January 1943.

USAAF units based at Kukum included:
12th Fighter Squadron operating P-39s from 7 February 1943 – 19 February 1944
68th Fighter Squadron operating P-38s and P-39s from January–December 1943
339th Fighter Squadron operating P-38s from 2 October 1942 (det) - 1 December 1943 and 29 December 1943 - 15 January 1944

USMC units based at Kukum included:
VMF-124 operating F4Us from 12 February–September 1943

Royal New Zealand Air Force units based at Kukum included:
1 Squadron operating Lockheed Venturas from October 1944
2 Squadron operating Venturas from August–October 1944
3 Squadron operating Venturas from July–August 1944
14 Squadron operating P-40s from 11 June-25 July 1943
15 Squadron operating P-40s 26 April–June 1943 and from mid-September-mid-November 1943
16 Squadron operating P-40s from 25 July - September 1943
17 Squadron operating P-40s from mid-September-20 October 1943

Postwar 
Kukum Field remained operational after the war as a civilian airfield until 1969 when Henderson Field was modernized and reopened as Honiara International Airport. The airfield is now part of the Honiara Golf Course.

See also

Carney Airfield
Henderson Field (Guadalcanal)
Koli Airfield
United States Army Air Forces in the South Pacific Area

References

Airfields of the United States Army Air Forces in the Pacific Ocean theatre of World War II
United States Marine Corps air stations
Aviation in the Solomon Islands
Military installations closed in the 1940s